Andrew B. "Drew" Posada (17 January 1969 – 4 January 2007) was an American comic book colorist and pin-up artist who has worked with Image Comics, Top Cow, Wildstorm and Extreme Studios, as well as published his pin-up work in The Art of Drew Posada, by SQP Inc in 2002.

Biography
Drew Posada was born with his an identical twin brother Alex Posada. Drew began his career at the age of 16, when he began being paid for his art, although he was often told that "art is not a way to make a living." With this in mind, he decided to go to college and worked after high school as a picture framer. Unsatisfied with this job, even when he had developed his own clientele, he moved from Seattle to Southern California where he was immediately hired by Image Comics in the spring of 1994.

Working in comics made Posada's style evolve, as he had to work with digital tools such as the digital airbrush, giving him more artistic flexibility and room for experimentation.

Posada's work in comics won him acclaim and a decent living, but he yearned to be recognized for his pin-up art. While he wanted to improve his technique, it was the work of the two legends of pin-up, Hajime Sorayama and Olivia De Berardinis who truly raised the bar for him. Artist Posada wrote gracefully about the impact Sorayama's work had upon him as an artist. And he knew that in order to have made it in the field of pin-up art, he had to be at Robert Bane Editions, who already represented both Sorayama and Olivia.

The first time that Posada asked Robert Bane Editions to represent him, they told him to improve his work; he then went back to his studio to focus on pin-ups, sacrificing his comfortable living with comic books.

Two years later, when he re-submitted his work to Robert Bane, it was greeted enthusiastically and welcomed to the gallery.

Posada died from pancreatitis in early January 2007.

Style

Using Adobe Photoshop for all his images, Posada is known by the way he represented the hair of his models.

He worked with models Suzi Simpson, Aria Giovanni and Julie Strain.

Some of his pin-up works

Cover of the pin-up comic book Venus Domina, published by Verotik in 1998, 
Cover of Jinn (1999) and The Wicked (1999), both published by Avalon Studios.
Several works for The Wicked comic book, through Avalon Studios, including working with the Angela character owned by Todd McFarlane and Vampirella.

References
The Art of Drew Posada. (SQP, 2002). .

External links
 Drew Posada's gallery at Pin-up Files

1969 births
2007 deaths
Deaths from pancreatitis
Pin-up artists
American comics artists
American erotic artists